Avalanche Bay is a bay  wide southeast of Discovery Bluff in Granite Harbour, Victoria Land. It was mapped by the British Antarctic Expedition, 1910–13 under Robert Falcon Scott and named by the expedition's Granite Harbour party because several avalanches were heard while sledging there.

References
 

Bays of Victoria Land
Scott Coast